Samuel Frimpong (born 10 October 1997) is a Ghanaian professional footballer who plays as a defender for Ghanaian Premier League side Kumasi Asante Kotoko.

Career

Early career 
Frimpong started his career with Ghana Division One League side Bekwai Youth Football Academy before moving to Asante Kotoko in 2018.

Asante Kotoko 
In early May 2018, there were reports that Ghana Premier League giants Kumasi Asante Kotoko were on the brink of signing the Frimpong by the directive of coach Paa Kwesi Fabin who was had been appointed as coach in February 2018 and was tasked with a duty of rebuilding the club. He was later part of the 24 member team named by Fabin during the club's camp ahead of the 2018 Ghana Premier League of the season. On 20 May 2018, the club announced that they had signed him on a 3-year deal from Bekwai Youth. He made his debut on 23 May 2018, playing the full 90 minutes in a 2–0 victory over Elmina Sharks. He went on to make 2 league appearances before the league was cancelled due to the dissolution of the GFA in June 2018, as a result of the Anas Number 12 Expose. In 2019, he became a favourite of Kjetil Zachariassen preferred right midfielder or right winger rather his usual position as a right-back during his time as coach. In August 2019, Zachariassen played him in both legs of the 2019–20 CAF Champions League match against Kano Pillars in that position, which Kotoko won on 4-3 aggregate.

Karela United (loan) 
In January 2020, he moved to Western Region-based team Karela United on a 1-year loan deal for the 2019–20 Ghana Premier League. He made his debut on 30 January 2020, playing the full 90 minutes in a 3–0 victory against Legon Cities, with Diawisie Taylor scoring a brace in the match. He cemented his place as the main right-back for the club and one of the stand out performers as he featured in 9 league matches before the league was put on hold and later abandoned due to the COVID-19 pandemic.

Return to Asante Kotoko 
At the end of his 1-year loan deal with Karela United he returned to Kumasi Asante Kotoko and was named in the club's squad list for the 2020–21 Ghana Premier League season. On 11 January 2021, he played the full 90 minutes in a 2–0 win over Liberty Professionals, a match which Kwame Opoku scored a brace.

Style of play 
Frimpong mainly plays as right-back, but he previously played as midfielder before moving to Bekwai Youth. He was again used in that role as a midfielder by Kjetil Zachariassen in 2019. Whilst on-loan at Karela United he stated that he had learnt a lot from Kotoko's right-back Amos Frimpong and Augustine Sefah but his role model was Godfred Saka and was modelling his style of play to fit just like him including putting on a dreadlocks (rasta) like Saka. Frimpong idolises Philip Lahm and  spends time to watch his videos.

References

External links 

 

Living people
1997 births
Association football defenders
Ghanaian footballers
Asante Kotoko S.C. players
Ghana Premier League players
Karela United FC players
Medeama SC players